Peter A. Leininger (January 2, 1860 – August 21, 1937) was an American builder and politician from New York.

Life 
Leininger was born on January 2, 1860, in New York City, New York, the son of Adam J. Leininger and Elizabeth Bittinger. His parents were both German immigrants from Bavaria. His father was a stone cutter, an American Civil War veteran who served with the 33rd New Jersey Infantry Regiment and the 69th New York Infantry Regiment, and an interpreter for the government in the West.

After finishing his limited schooling, Leininger spent a year working in Devoe's oil yard in Greenport. He then spent two years working with an uncle in Empire Laundry. He then became a machinist with P. J. Jennings for two and a half years. This was followed by six months as a lithographer. He then worked in the Steinway & Sons for six years, later working for piano action manufacturers Wesley, Nickel & Gross. He then formed a partnership with his brother and worked as a contractor and builder in New York City, later taking an interest in the Berman Brothers carpet store.

In 1883, Leininger moved to Long Island City and became involved in the building business. Interested in the real estate business, he bought a seven-acre tract of land and built up Hoyt Avenue, Debevoise Avenue, and Lawrence Street. He also built and sold a brick double flat in South Brooklyn and worked as an appraiser of property. In 1887, he was an organizer of the Long Island City Building and Loan Association, serving as a director until his retirement in 1916. In 1893, he became a City Assessor in Long Island City, and he was president of the Board of Assessors for three years before the consolidation with the Greater City in 1898.

In the 1904 United States House of Representatives election, Leininger was the People's Party's candidate for New York's 14th congressional district. He lost the election to Charles A. Towne. In 1916, he was elected to the New York State Assembly as a Democrat, representing the Queens County 1st District. He served in the Assembly in 1917, 1918, 1919, 1920, 1921, 1922, and 1923. In 1919, he introduced a bill that provided for constructing a tunnel from Astoria through Ward's Island under the Hudson River to Manhattan.

Leininger was a member of the Elks and the State Volunteer Fire Department. He was a volunteer fireman of the Mohawk Hose Company and president of the Veteran Firemans' Association of Long Island City. He was married to Kate Smith of New York City. His children were Mrs. Eugene E. Heaton and Mrs. Elsie Beeker.

Leininger died after falling from his window of his Astoria home while repairing the window frame on August 21, 1937.

References

External links 

 The Political Graveyard

1860 births
1937 deaths
American people of German descent
People from Long Island City, Queens
People from Astoria, Queens
Politicians from Queens, New York
American builders
American real estate businesspeople
People's Party (United States) politicians
20th-century American politicians
Democratic Party members of the New York State Assembly
American firefighters
Accidental deaths in New York (state)
Accidental deaths from falls